Hatayspor Kulübü, known as Atakaş Hatayspor due to sponsorship reasons, is a Turkish professional football club located in Antakya, Hatay Province.

History 
Hatayspor was founded on 23 July 1967. In July 2020, the team achieved promotion to the Süper Lig as champions of the 2019–20 TFF First League.

In January 2022, the club launched a partnership with Philippines Football League club Dynamic Herb Cebu.

During the first of the 2023 Turkey–Syria earthquakes, the club's quarters in Antakya collapsed, trapping players and staff. All were rescued except player Christian Atsu who died, and sporting director Taner Savut, whose body was found on 21 February, 2023. Following the earthquake, the club withdrew from the league.

Rivalries 
The team which Hatayspor most played against is Tarsus İdman Yurdu. So far, there have been 43 games between the teams. Hatayspor won 17 of 43, Tarsus Idman Yurdu won 15 of 43, and 11 games ended with draw.

Statistics

League participations
 Süper Lig: 2020–
 TFF First League: 1970–76, 1980–83, 1990–92, 1993–2002, 2018–2020
 TFF Second League: 1967–70, 1976–80, 1984–90, 1992–93, 2002–08, 2012–18
 TFF Third League: 2008–12
 Amateur League: 1983–84

League performances

Source: TFF: Hatayspor

Players

Current squad

Out on loan

Affiliated clubs 
''The following club is currently affiliated with Hatayspor:
  Dynamic Herb Cebu (2022–present)

References

External links 
Official website
Hatayspor on TFF.org

 
Sport in Antakya
Football clubs in Hatay
Association football clubs established in 1967
1967 establishments in Turkey
Süper Lig clubs